Parks and Recreation is an American television series created by Greg Daniels and Michael Schur. It has been billed as a companion piece to Daniels' and Schur's other comedy, The Office.

Produced and broadcast by NBC, Parks and Recreation is filmed in the same mockumentary style as The Office and follows Leslie Knope (Amy Poehler), a mid-level bureaucrat in the Parks and Recreation Department in the fictional town of Pawnee, Indiana. Inspired by local nurse Ann Perkins (Rashida Jones), Leslie vows to turn a vacant lot with a large pit into a beautiful park. The show's original line-up was Aziz Ansari as Tom Haverford, an administrator; Nick Offerman as Ron Swanson, head of the Parks and Recreation department and Leslie's superior; Aubrey Plaza as April Ludgate, an intern; Jim O'Heir as Jerry Gergich and Retta as Donna Meagle, other employees of the Parks and Recreation department; Chris Pratt as Andy Dwyer, Ann's boyfriend who was injured in the pit; and Paul Schneider as Mark Brendanawicz, a city planner. Schneider left the series after the second season and was replaced by Adam Scott as Ben Wyatt and Rob Lowe as Chris Traeger, state auditors tasked with evaluating the Parks and Recreation department. In the sixth season, Jones and Lowe left while Billy Eichner joined as series regular, Craig Middlebrooks.

The series ran for 125 episodes over seven seasons from April 9, 2009, until February 24, 2015, with a special episode aired on April 30, 2020.

Series overview

Episodes
Average episode runtime is 21–22 minutes without commercials. † denotes a longer 25–28 minute episode while  denotes a "double-length" 42-minute episode.

Season 1 (2009)

Season 2 (2009–10)

Season 3 (2011)

Season 4 (2011–12)

Season 5 (2012–13)

Season 6 (2013–14)

Season 7 (2015)

Special episode (2020)
In April 2020, amidst the COVID-19 pandemic, NBC announced they would air a new, special episode of the series, centered on Leslie trying to stay connected with the other residents of Pawnee during social distancing. The series' cast returned for the special, which benefited Feeding America's COVID-19 response.

Ratings

References

External links

Pawnee, Indiana 

 
Parks and Recreation